The Freiberg House, designed by Melbourne-based architects Chancellor and Patrick, was built in 1958-60 on a sloping site as a residence for the Freiberg family and is located at 26 Yarravale Road Kew, Victoria. The Freiberg is an example of post-war architecture in Victoria featuring a -storey geometric structure with a modified cruciform plan.  Featured on the cover of Best Australian Houses (1961), edited by Neil Clerehan, the Freiberg house was significant for its use of traditional Australian forms and materials, combined with the Melbourne post-war interest in avant-garde planning, forms and structure.  It is also notable for having the first entirely native garden planned by Edna Walling, with whom Chancellor and Patrick was a long-time collaborator.

Description 

The Freiberg house is a -storey exposed brick house featuring an axial 'T' plan with low-pitched gable roofs, horizontal bands of windows and its distinctive broad overhanging exposed timber eaves. Each arm of the T serves as a different function: sleeping and bathrooms; living room; or kitchen/dining. At the lowest level are entry, carports/garage and bedsitting room for guests with its own toilet which also serves the hallway. The entry into the house is through two exposed brick piers which lead through the carport to the main entrance. The second level, the main living space, the long arm of the T contains three bedrooms one with its own bathroom and the other two share an elaborate divided bathroom; designed to accommodate the growing Freiberg family. The main living room is projected outwards towards the street with two of the sides opening out onto the terrace. The middle floor features a high vaulted ceiling and cathedral window above the door allowing for natural light to penetrate through the main living spaces. Towards the rear wing of the T are the kitchen and dining areas which is glazed on three of its sides, the other opening to the kitchen. On the upper floor is a private study with windows on all walls allowing for natural light and providing views of the surrounding Studley Park.

The construction of the Freiberg house is predominately brick with sections most notably the balconies and spandrils rendered. A key part of the design was the use of exposed Oregon purlins and brickwork as it was considered avant-garde during the time of construction.  The perfection of the house's central brick wall bears witness to the meticulousness of the architect as the first was demolished and rebuilt. Within the house, a range of unadorned timbers was chosen to help reflect the native palette of the landscape creating a harmony between the inside and outside spaces. The landscape designed by Edna Walling is a completely Australian native garden featuring a bluestone wall, built by Eric Hammond, towering gumtrees and other indigenous plants.

Key influences and design approach 
Chancellor and Patrick mediated modernism with concern for the region and site. Their approach to architecture saw the revival Frank Lloyd Wright's Usonian house principles between the 1950s and 1960s.  Usonian architecture grew out of Frank Lloyd Wright's earlier Prairie style homes which featured low roofs and open living areas.  The style made use of brick, wood, and other natural material. Influenced by the Usonian style, the Freiberg House saw the use of exposed brick and natural Australian timbers. The broad eaves recall not only Melbourne houses of Walter Burley Griffin, but also Californian houses of Harwell Hamilton Harris using similar technique of exposing the purlin beams beyond line of the house. Oregon joinery detailing in the Freiberg house suggest Japanese inspiration influencing for fittings and colour scheme within the house.

Gallery

References

External links
 http://www.studleypark.net/chancellor---patrick.htm

Houses in Melbourne
Houses completed in 1960